The following is a list of the 23 cantons of the Tarn department, in France, following the French canton reorganisation which came into effect in March 2015:

 Albi-1
 Albi-2
 Albi-3
 Albi-4
 Carmaux-1 Le Ségala
 Carmaux-2 Vallée du Cérou
 Castres-1
 Castres-2
 Castres-3
 Les Deux Rives
 Gaillac
 Graulhet
 Le Haut Dadou
 Les Hautes Terres d'Oc
 Lavaur Cocagne
 Mazamet-1
 Mazamet-2 Vallée du Thoré
 La Montagne noire
 Le Pastel
 Plaine de l'Agoût
 Les Portes du Tarn
 Saint-Juéry
 Vignobles et Bastides

References